Dharmapur is a union of Fatikchhari Upazila of Chittagong District, Bangladesh.

Geography

Area of Dharmapur: 3,719 acres (15.05 km2).

Location
North: Nanupur Union 
East:  Raozan Upazila
South: Raozan Upazila,
West:  Baktapur and Jafotnagar Unions

Population
As of 1991 Bangladesh census, Dharmapur union has a population of 20,168 and house units 3469.

Marketplaces and bazars
Azadi bazar is the main marketplace of the Union. Ramju Monsir Hat also historical Market in this
area which is adjacent to Dharmapur Multi lateral high school.

Education
There are many educational institutions in this village.

Dharmapur amdadul ulum madrasha 
Dharmapur KG school
Dharmapur multilateral high school
Dharmapur komol krishna balika High school
Mamodhamoi Govt primary school
North dharmapur high school
Azadibazar madrasha
Hazrat Zaber(R)Islamic Academy
Rahmania senior madrasha
Sultanul Ulum madrasa
West dharmapur govt primary school
Dharmapur Judge Bari Govt Primary School 
F.R idial kinder garden
Al ansar islami academey
Darul koran islami academy
and most famous educational institution
Alimullah Govt.primary school
haji mosharaf ali primary school
 south dharmapur forkania madrasah
and other.

References

Unions of Fatikchhari Upazila